Danish-Polish relations are foreign relations between the states of Denmark and Poland. Both countries are full members of NATO, the European Union, OECD, OSCE, the Council of the Baltic Sea States, HELCOM, the Council of Europe and the World Trade Organization, and share a maritime border in the Baltic Sea.

History

Danish-Polish relations date back to the Middle Ages. In the medieval period, Poland and Denmark entered into alliances several times, incl. in the 1120s, 1315, 1350, 1363 and 1419. During the Polish-Teutonic wars of 1409–1411 and 1454–1466, Denmark temporarily sided with the Teutonic Knights, however, there were very few Danish-Polish clashes. Between those wars, Eric of Pomerania of the House of Griffin became King of Denmark as Eric VII in 1396, and reigned until 1439, as the first ruler of the Kalmar Union. Denmark and Poland were allies during the Northern Seven Years' War, however, shortly after the war, in 1571, the Danish Navy conducted a naval raid of the Polish ports of Puck and Hel in the naval battle near Hel. Both countries were again allies in the Second Northern War and Great Northern War. Prince George of Denmark was a candidate in the 1674 Polish–Lithuanian royal election.

Denmark, besides Spain, Turkey and Iran, objected to the Partitions of Poland between Prussia, Austria and Russia in 1795. In 1848, Poles and Danes simultaneously fought against Prussia, the Poles in the Greater Poland Uprising in an attempt to regain independence, and the Danes in the First Schleswig War, repelling a Prussian invasion. Denmark eventually also fell victim to expansionist policies of Prussia and Austria, which invaded and annexed its southern territories in the Second Schleswig War in 1864.

Both countries re-established diplomatic relations in 1919, after Poland regained independence following World War I. During the German-Soviet invasion of Poland, which started World War II in September 1939, Denmark declared neutrality, however, in 1940 it still became the second country to be invaded by Germany during the war.

In 1985, the Polish-Scandinavian Institute in Copenhagen was founded.

Modern relations

Denmark and Poland co-hosted the 2013 Men's European Volleyball Championship.

Poland is one of Denmark's ten main trading partners. In 2019, Poland was the sixth largest source of imports and the eight largest export destination for Denmark. In 2020, Poland became the fifth largest source of imports to Denmark, surpassing Norway.

Denmark and Poland are close NATO allies, and their militaries cooperate as part of the Multinational Corps Northeast, headquartered in Szczecin, Poland.

The Baltic Pipe, connecting Norway with Denmark and Poland, was commissioned in September 2022. Its purpose is to ensure natural gas supplies from Norway to Denmark and Poland.

Resident diplomatic missions 
 Denmark has an embassy in Warsaw.
 Poland has an embassy in Copenhagen.

Honorary consulates
There are honorary consulates of Denmark in Gdynia, Kraków, Łódź, Poznań, Szczecin and Wrocław, and an honorary consulate of Poland in Aarhus.

See also
 Foreign relations of Denmark
 Foreign relations of Poland
 Poles in Denmark
 Danes in Poland
 Poland in the European Union

References

External links 

 
Poland
Bilateral relations of Poland